Hydraenidae is a family of very small aquatic beetles, sometimes called "Minute moss beetles", with a worldwide distribution.  They are around 0.8 to 3.3 mm in length. The adults store air on the underside of the body as well as beneath the elytra which allows them to crawl underwater, often on the underside of the water surface tension, though they cannot swim. Some species have gills that effectively allow them to stay underwater indefinitely. Larvae vary from being fully terrestrial, to being aquatic at least in their earliest instars. The diet of hydraenid larvae and adults is thought to consist of algae, spores and other plant matter. At least some hydraenid adults use stridulation to communicate. There are around 1,300 species in 42 genera.

Genera

These 56 genera belong to the family Hydraenidae:

 Adelphydraena Perkins, 1989
 Archaeodraena Jäch & Yamamoto, 2017
 Aulacochthebius Kuwert, 1887
 Calobius Wollaston, 1854
 Cobalius Rey, 1886
 Coelometopon Janssens, 1972
 Davidraena Jäch, 1994
 Decarthrocerus Orchymont, 1948
 Discozantaena Perkins & Balfour-Browne, 1994
 Edaphobates Jäch & Díaz, 2003-01
 Enicocerus Stephens, 1829
 Ginkgoscia Jäch & Díaz, 2004-01
 Gondraena Jäch, 1994
 Gymnanthelius Perkins, 1997
 Gymnochthebius Orchymont, 1943
 Haptaenida Perkins, 1997
 Heptaenida Perkins, 1997
 Homalaena Ordish, 1984
 Hughleechia Perkins, 1981
 Hydraena Kugelann, 1794
 Hydraenida Germain, 1901
 Hydroenida Germain, 1901
 Hymenodes Mulsant, 1844
 Laeliaena Sahlberg, 1900
 Limnebius Leach, 1815
 Madagaster Perkins, 1997
 Menomadraena Perkins, 2017
 Meropathus Enderlein, 1901
 Micragasma Sahlberg, 1900
 Neochthebius Orchymont, 1932
 Nucleotops Perkins & Balfour-Browne, 1994
 Ochtebiites Ponomarenko, 1977
 Ochthebius Leach, 1815
 Ochtheosus Perkins, 1997
 Oomtelecopon Perkins, 2005
 Orchymontia Broun, 1919
 Parasthetops Perkins & Balfour-Browne, 1994-31
 Parhydraena Orchymont, 1937
 Parhydraenopsis Perkins, 2009-16
 Phothydraena Kuwert, 1888
 Pneuminion Perkins, 1997
 Podaena Ordish, 1984
 Prionochthebius Kuwert, 1887
 Prosthetops Waterhouse, 1879
 Protochthebius Perkins, 1997
 Protosthetops Perkins, 1994
 Protozantaena Perkins, 1997
 Pterosthetops Perkins, 1994
 Sebasthetops Jäch, 1998-01
 Sicilicula Balfour-Browne, 1958
 Spanglerina Perkins, 1980
 Trinomadraena Perkins, 2017
 Tympallopatrum Perkins, 1997
 Mesoceration Janssens, 1967
 Parhydraenida Balfour-Browne, 1975
 Tympanogaster Janssens, 1967

Extinct genera 

 †Archaeodraena Jäch and Yamamoto 2017, Burmese amber, Myanmar, Late Cretaceous (Cenomanian)
 †Ochtebiites Ponomarenko 1977 Abasheva Formation, Russia, Early Jurassic (Pliensbachian), Ichetuy Formation, Russia, Karabastau Formation, Kazakhstan, Late Jurassic (Oxfordian), Mogotuin Formation, Mongolia, Early Cretaceous (Aptian)

References

External links

 Hydraenidae, Identification and Ecology of Australian Freshwater Invertebrates.
Hydraenidae at Tolweb

Staphylinoidea
Beetle families